Mehdi Asgarkani  is an Iranian football goalkeeper who joined the Iranian national team in the 1976 Asian Cup. He also played for Persepolis and Aboomoslem.

Honours 
Iran
Asian Cup: 1976

References

External links
Stats

Iran international footballers
Living people
1976 AFC Asian Cup players
Iranian footballers
Persepolis F.C. players
Paykan F.C. players
Al Salmiya SC players
F.C. Aboomoslem players
Association football goalkeepers
Sportspeople from Tehran
AFC Asian Cup-winning players
1948 births